Blues for Lou is an album by American jazz guitarist Grant Green featuring performances recorded in 1963, but not released on the Blue Note label until 1999. The album combines recordings from two different sessions that featured Green with organist Big John Patton and drummer Ben Dixon. The title track was named for saxophonist Lou Donaldson.

Reception

The Allmusic review by Ken Dryden awarded the album 3 stars and stated "While this session may not have met producer Alfred Lion's very high standards, it was worthy of release and definitely a worthwhile investment for fans of Grant Green".

Track listing

Recorded on February 20 (tracks 1 & 3-8) & June 7 (track 2), 1963

Personnel
Grant Green - guitar
Big John Patton - organ
Ben Dixon - drums

References 

Grant Green albums
1999 albums
Blue Note Records albums
Albums produced by Alfred Lion
Albums recorded at Van Gelder Studio